Stewart's Independent Cavalry Battalion (Illinois) was a cavalry battalion that served in the Union Army during the American Civil War.

Service
Stewart's Battalion was consolidated in July 1862 at Jackson, Tennessee from Stewart's Independent Cavalry Company as Company "A;" Carmichael's Independent Cavalry Company as Company "B;" Dollins' Independent Cavalry Company  as Company "C;" O'Harnett's Independent Cavalry Company as Company "D"; Hutchins' Independent Cavalry Company as Company "E."

The battalion was transferred to the 15th Regiment Illinois Volunteer Cavalry on December 25, 1862 as Companies "A," "B," "C," "D," "E" and "F".

Total strength and casualties

Commanders

See also
List of Illinois Civil War Units
Illinois in the American Civil War

Notes

References
The Civil War Archive

Units and formations of the Union Army from Illinois
1861 establishments in Illinois
Military units and formations established in 1861
Military units and formations disestablished in 1862